Events from the year 1363 in Ireland.

Incumbent
Lord: Edward III

Events
 13 June - The unification of the two sees of Waterford and Lismore

Births

Deaths
 10 December – Elizabeth de Burgh, 4th Countess of Ulster

References 

 
1360s in Ireland
Ireland